"Breathing" is a song by Kate Bush, from her 1980 album Never for Ever, with backing vocals by Roy Harper.

The single was issued on 14 April 1980 as the album's lead single and reached number 16 in the UK charts, remaining in the charts for seven weeks. It was the first single by Bush to feature a non-LP track on its B-side, "The Empty Bullring".

Content
"Breathing" is about a foetus, very much aware of what is going on outside the womb and frightened by nuclear fallout, which implies that the song is set either during a nuclear war scare or a post-apocalyptic birth. The lyrics also refer to the unborn baby absorbing nicotine from the mother's smoking. In an interview that year Bush described the song as her "little symphony", adding that she considered it her best work to date. Bush stated that the information within the song mostly came from a documentary she had seen about the effects of nuclear war, while the tone of the song was inspired by Pink Floyd's The Wall (side three in particular). The song was recorded over three days in early 1980.

The track includes spoken words describing the flash from a nuclear bomb.

The music video features Bush in a womb portraying a foetus. Bush performed the song live in the benefit concert in aid of The Prince's Trust in July 1982. In 1985, Bush donated the song as her contribution to the multi-artist compilation Greenpeace – The Album.

Charts

See also
List of anti-war songs

References

Kate Bush songs
Songs about nuclear war and weapons
1980 singles
Songs written by Kate Bush
1980 songs
Roy Harper (singer) songs
EMI Records singles
War scare